Probable ribosome biogenesis protein RLP24 is a protein that in humans is encoded by the RSL24D1 gene.

This gene encodes a protein sharing a low level of sequence similarity with human ribosomal protein L24. Although this gene has been referred to as RPL24, L30, and 60S ribosomal protein L30 isolog in the sequence databases, it is distinct from the human genes officially named RPL24 (which itself has been referred to as ribosomal protein L30) and RPL30. The function of this gene is currently unknown. This gene utilizes alternative polyadenylation signals.

References

External links

Further reading

Ribosomal proteins